Theodore Balina (/Teodor Balina) was an Ottoman Bulgarian nobleman and leader in the Sanjak of Nicopolis who led the First Tarnovo Uprising against the Ottoman Empire in 1598.

Life
To him the local merchant from Ragusa Pavel Đorđević writes:

Except Theodore, the uprising was organized by religious leaders, as well as public figures and merchants. These included the Archbishop of Tarnovo Dionysus Rali, Pavle Đorđević and the Sorkočević brothers, with the bishops Theophanes of Lovech, Jeremiah of Rousse, Spyridon of Shumen and Methodius of Thrace and other high-ranking religious figures also taking part in the organization.

The invasion of Wallachian forces under Michael the Brave in the northern Bulgarian lands in the autumn of 1598 provided good conditions for the uprising, as the fellow Christian army would support the insurrection according to the plan. At the time the Ottomans were engaged in the Long War with the Habsburg monarchy. One descendant (may be Theodore Balina) of the medieval Shishman dynasty was proclaimed Tsar of Bulgaria (as Shishman III) and Tarnovo was briefly liberated, with about 12,000 people gathering.

As a consequence, about 16,000 Bulgarians fled centrally-governed Ottoman territory and crossed the Danube to settle in autonomous neighbouring Wallachia, where they established a Bulgarian community. The leader of Uprising emigrated to Russia.

References

People from Veliko Tarnovo
Bulgarian revolutionaries
17th-century Bulgarian people
Rebels from the Ottoman Empire
People from Nikopol, Bulgaria
16th-century Bulgarian people